These Arms of Mine is a Canadian television drama series that aired on CBC Television in the 2000-01 television season.

The show revolved around a group of professional friends in their 30s living in Vancouver, British Columbia. It centred on Alex Carter as photographer David Bishop and Shauna MacDonald as radio announcer Claire Monroe; the first episode centred on Claire's decision, after they had been in a long-distance relationship for more than a year, to move from her home in Toronto to live with David in Vancouver. The series was created by Phil Savath and Susan Duligal, based in part on their own early long-distance relationship prior to marrying in 1997.

The cast also included Stuart Margolin as Miles Rankin, a former American draft dodger running for Vancouver city council; Conrad Coates as Steven Armstrong, a gay drama teacher grieving the recent death of his partner to AIDS; Babz Chula as magazine editor Esme Price; Byron Lawson as her much younger restaurateur husband Amos Lee; and Colleen Rennison as Sophie, David's teenage daughter from his previous marriage.

The series was produced by Forefront Entertainment.

Chula won the Gemini Award for Best Actress in a Continuing Leading Dramatic Role at the 16th Gemini Awards in 2001.

The show was not a ratings success, and was not renewed for a second season.

References

External links

CBC Television original programming
2000 Canadian television series debuts
Television shows filmed in Vancouver
Television shows set in Vancouver
2001 Canadian television series endings
2000s Canadian drama television series
2000s Canadian LGBT-related drama television series